Andrada Cynthia Tomescu (born 30 July 1991) is a Romanian handballer for Dacia Mioveni.

Achievements 
Liga Naţională:
Gold Medalist: 2014
Silver Medalist: 2013
Bronze Medalist: 2018

Cupa României:
Gold Medalist: 2013, 2014
Silver Medalist: 2016
Bronze Medalist: 2015

Supercupa României:
Winner: 2013, 2014

References

 

1991 births
Living people
Sportspeople from Baia Mare
Romanian female handball players
CS Minaur Baia Mare (women's handball) players